Paracyrba is a genus of jumping spiders found only in Malaysia. It contains only one species, Paracyrba wanlessi. Its microhabitat are the water-filled hollow internodes of decaying bamboo, where it preys for aquatic animals, especially mosquito larvae. P. wanlessi and Evarcha culicivora, a jumping spider, are the only two spiders that have been experimentally studied and considered a mosquito specialist. E. culicivora indirectly feeds vertebrate blood by preying female mosquitos that carry blood. In general only one specimen is found per occupied bamboo internode.

Description
Females are up to 9 mm long, males 7 to 8. The spiders is generally dark colored. On the flattened carapace, there is a central whitish band, which is much larger in the female. On the opisthosoma there are four to five transverse, yellowish bands, and a light area near the spinnerets. The long, thin legs are suited for their stealthy, non-jumping movements. The genitals are very similar to those of Cyrba, and P. wanlessi seems to have separated from it mainly due to its lifestyle.

Name
The genus name is a combination of the Ancient Greek para "near to" and the name of the related genus Cyrba. The species is named in honor of Fred R. Wanless, who contributed much to the knowledge about the subfamily Spartaeinae.

Footnotes

References
 Murphy, Frances & Murphy, John (2000): An Introduction to the Spiders of South East Asia. Malaysian Nature Society, Kuala Lumpur.
 Zhang, J.X.; Woon, J.R.W. & Li, D. (2006): A new genus and species of jumping spiders (Araneae:Salticidae:Spartaeinae) from Malaysia. The Raffles Bulletin of Zoology 54(2): 241-244. PDF

Footnotes
 Salticidae.org: Diagnostic drawings and photographs

Salticidae
Monotypic Salticidae genera
Invertebrates of Malaysia
Spiders of Asia